

The Davis DA-2 is a light aircraft designed in the United States in the 1960s and was marketed for homebuilding.  While it is a low-wing monoplane of largely conventional design with fixed tricycle undercarriage, the DA-2 is given a distinctive appearance by its slab-like fuselage construction and its V-tail. The pilot and a single passenger sit side-by-side. Construction of the aircraft is sheet aluminum throughout, with the sole compound curves formed a fiberglass cowling and fairings.

The prototype made its first flight on May 21, 1966, and was exhibited at that year's Experimental Aircraft Association annual fly-in, where it won awards for "most outstanding design" and "most popular aircraft".

A major design consideration was ease of assembly for a first time home aircraft builder. Examples of this include: few curved components, a V-tail is one less control surface to build, and each wing is made from two sheets of aluminum with no trimming involved.

The DA-3 was a single DA-2 enlarged to accommodate four people. Work proceeded through 1973-74, but the aircraft was never completed.

Plans have been intermittently available over the years.  They are as of August 2019, available from D2 Aircraft.

Operational history
Examples of the DA-2 have been completed in the United States, Canada and the United Kingdom and are currently (2015) actively flying in those countries.

Variants
DA-2 -- Continental A-65 powered
DA-2A—Continental O-200A powered
DA-2B—3 inch lower roof line
DA-3

Specifications (typical DA-2)

References
Notes

Sources

External links
 http://www.yahoogroups.com/da2a
Builder Group 
 http://www.davisda2.com Current source for plans also a users forum.

1960s United States civil utility aircraft
Davis aircraft
Homebuilt aircraft
Single-engined tractor aircraft
Low-wing aircraft
V-tail aircraft
Aircraft first flown in 1966